The Russian Orthodox Church of the Resurrection is an Eastern Orthodox church building in Montevideo, Uruguay. Paris was found in 1920s.

Unique in its type and denomination in Uruguay, it is part of the Diocese of South America of the Russian Orthodox Church Outside of Russia.

See also
 Russian Orthodox Church
 Russians in Uruguay

References

Church buildings in Montevideo
Eastern Orthodox church buildings in Uruguay
Russian Orthodox church buildings
Churches completed in 1920
Russian Orthodox Church Outside of Russia
Russian immigration to Uruguay
Uruguay